The 1985–86 Segunda División was the 37th season of the Mexican Segunda División. The season started on 16 August 1985 and concluded on 18 May 1986. It was won by Cobras. 

Since this season, the regional competition system was eliminated and the matches between all the member teams returned for two rounds.

Changes 
 Irapuato was promoted to Primera División.
 Zacatepec was relegated from Primera División.
 La Piedad was promoted from Segunda División B.
 Búfalos Curtidores was promoted from Tercera División, due to this promotion, the first Unión de Curtidores team was bought by the Government of Quintana Roo, moved to Chetumal and renamed as Chicleros de Chetumal.
 Nuevo Necaxa was relegated to Segunda División B, however, the club board bought the Tulancingo franchise and remained at Segunda División. Also, the team was relocated at Tulancingo.
 Pumas ENEP was promoted from Segunda División B, however, the franchise was bought by Chapulineros de Oaxaca and that team took its place in the league.
 Texcoco sold its franchise to Atlacomulco.

Teams

Group stage

Group 1

Group 2

Group 3

Group 4

Results

Final stage

Group 1

Group 2

Final

Relegation Group

References 

1985–86 in Mexican football
Segunda División de México seasons